Étang Saint-Nicolas is an artificial lake in Angers, Maine-et-Loire, France. Its surface is 3.6 ha.

Saint Nicolas
Landforms of Maine-et-Loire